Kristina Mladenovic was the defending champion, but lost in the final to unseeded Petra Kvitová, 1–6, 2–6. As a result, Kvitová became the first left-handed player to win a singles title in Russia. She was also the first wildcard to win the event.

Seeds
The top four seeds received a bye into the second round.

Draw

Finals

Top half

Bottom half

Qualifying

Seeds

Qualifiers

Lucky loser

Qualifying draw

First qualifier

Second qualifier

Third qualifier

Fourth qualifier

References
 Main Draw
 Qualifying Draw

St. Petersburg Ladies' Trophy - Singles
St. Petersburg Ladies' Trophy